The 2005 BMW Championship was the 51st edition of the BMW Championship, an annual professional golf tournament on the European Tour. It was held 26–29 May at the West Course of Wentworth Club in Virginia Water, Surrey, England, a suburb southwest of London.

It was the first year the event's sponsorship had been taken on by BMW, after Volvo's contract to sponsor the event had expired.

Ángel Cabrera won by two strokes ahead of Paul McGinley, having had two previous runner-up finishes in the event.

Course layout

Past champions in the field 
Ten former champions entered the tournament.

Made the cut

Missed the cut

Nationalities in the field

Round summaries

First round 
Thursday, 26 May 2005

Second round 
Friday, 27 May 2005

Third round 
Saturday, 28 May 2005

Final round 
Sunday, 29 May 2005

Scorecard

Cumulative tournament scores, relative to par

Source:

References 

BMW PGA Championship
Golf tournaments in England
BMW Championship
BMW Championship
BMW Championship